Psychotria mariniana, the forest wild coffee or kōpiko, is a tree endemic to Hawaii.  The plant belongs to the Rubiaceae (coffee) family, subfamily Rubioidae.  It is a tree of varying size with a dark bark, shiny leaves, and orange oval fruit.

A distinctive line of glands along the bottom of the central vein of each leaf connects this plant to the Hawaiian word for it, since piko means navel (in Hawaiian).  The word kōpiko applies to all the Hawaiian plants in the genus Psychotria.

See also
 Kopiko (confectionery)

References

External links
 
 A page about growing kōpiko in gardens (Google Books).
 A hiking page referring to kōpiko (Google Books)

mariniana
Endemic flora of Hawaii
Plants described in 1829
Trees of Hawaii
Flora without expected TNC conservation status